Trivellona catei is a species of small sea snail, a marine gastropod mollusk in the family Triviidae, the false cowries or trivias.

Description
The length of the shell attains 11 mm.

Distribution
This marine species occurs off the Philippines and New Caledonia

References

Triviidae
Gastropods described in 2004